Kenilworth is a suburb of Johannesburg, South Africa. The suburb has Turffontein to the west and Rosettenville to the east, with the Turffontein Racecourse on its northern boundary. It is located in Region F of the City of Johannesburg Metropolitan Municipality.

History
Prior to the discovery of gold on the Witwatersrand in 1886, the suburb lay on land on one of the original farms called Turffontein. It became a suburb in 1906, with Turffontein and Kenilworth part of Casey's Township.

References

Johannesburg Region F